Tsuneonella mangrovi is a Gram-negative, rod-shaped and facultative anaerobic bacterium from the genus Tsuneonella which has been isolated from mangrove sediments from Zhangzhou in China.

References 

Sphingomonadales
Bacteria described in 2017